Bektauata is a range of mountains in Aktogay District, Karaganda Region, Kazakhstan.

The range is part of the Bektauata State Zoological Nature Sanctuary, a IUCN Category IV protected area. There is a campsite in one of the valleys of the range.

History
The Bektauata burial ground is an early Iron Age archaeological site, belonging to the Tasmola culture. A gold earring with a fixed cone-shaped pendant decorated with granulation was found in one of the ancient mounds.

Geography 
Bektauata is a small rocky range of moderate altitude located at the southern end of the Kazakh Upland system (Saryarka). The dry alluvial plain at the mouth of the Tokrau river lies to the east of the range. The nearest airport is Balkhash Airport. There are rock formations, caves and rock pools in different spots of the Bektauata area.

Other important peaks are Sarykulzha —, two-peaked Konyrkulzha — (western summit), Karashoky — and Zhaltas —.

Flora
There is almost no vegetation on the slopes of the range, which are bare and rocky. In the valleys and by some of the rockpools there is tree growth, including aspen and willow, as well as shrubs.

See also
Geography of Kazakhstan
Barrows of Tasmola

References

External links

Bektau Ata mountains - Trekking Club
Visit Kazakhstan
Kazakh Uplands

ru: